Alfred Mulock Rogers (June 30, 1926 – May 1968), better known as Al Mulock or Al Mulloch, was a Canadian character actor.

Early life
Alfred Mulock Rogers was born on June 30, 1926 in Toronto, Ontario, Canada. He was the only child of Adèle Cawthra Mulock (1904–1970) and Alfred Rogers. Maternally he was descended from the Mulock family, headed by Sir William Mulock KCMG, the former Postmaster-General of Canada and one of the wealthiest families in the then-Dominion of Canada.

Career
He attended the Lee Strasberg's Actors Studio in New York City, United States. Then, with David de Keyser, he started The London Studio, which taught method acting to British actors. Mulock became active in the British film industry in the 1950s and early 1960s, making numerous appearances in various British television series and films.

He is best known for his roles in Spaghetti Western films, most notably in his two collaborations with Sergio Leone, The Good, the Bad and the Ugly and Once Upon a Time in the West.  He appears, and is memorably shot in each film: by Eli Wallach's character, Tuco, in the former and by Charles Bronson's character (in a shoot out along with two others) in the opening scene of the latter.

Death
Mulock died by suicide by jumping from his hotel room in Guadix, Granada, Spain in May 1968, while filming for Once Upon a Time in the West. He was wearing his cowboy-style costume at the time of his fall. Mickey Knox, screenwriter for the film, and production manager Claudio Mancini witnessed Mulock's suicide as his body passed their hotel window near the end of the shoot. Mulock survived the fall, but suffered a pierced lung from a broken rib during the bumpy ride to the hospital. Before being taken away in the ambulance, director Sergio Leone shouted, "Get the costume, we need the costume."

The reasons for his suicide, as well as for his choice of killing himself while wearing his costume, are unknown. About a year before Mulock’s suicide his wife had died of cervical cancer. However they had been separated for some time before her death so this may or may not have had an influence on his decision to end his life. Mickey Knox also claimed in his book, The Good, the Bad and the Dolce Vita, that Mulock was a drug addict, and committed suicide out of desperation, as he was unable to acquire drugs in Guadix.

Family
Al Mulock was the great-grandson of Sir William Mulock (1843–1944), the former Canadian Postmaster-General. He was married to actress Steffi Henderson, but she died in 1967 of cervical cancer. They had one child.

Selected filmography

 Joe MacBeth (1955) – First Assassin
 Wicked as They Come (1956) – Supporting Role (uncredited)
 Interpol (1957) – Interrogator
 Kill Me Tomorrow (1957) – Rod
 The One That Got Away (1957) – US Patrolman at Ogdensburg (uncredited)
 High Hell (1958) – Frank Davidson
 Death Over My Shoulder (1958) – Brainy Peterson
 Dial 999 (TV series) ('Commando Crook', episode) (1958) - Kendall
 The Sheriff of Fractured Jaw (1958) – Henchman (uncredited)
 Tarzan's Greatest Adventure (1959) – Dino
 Jazz Boat (1960) – The Dancer
 In the Nick (1960) – Dancer
 Tarzan the Magnificent (1960) – Martin Banton
 The Mark (1961) – Convict
 The Hellions (1961) – Mark Billings
 The Longest Day (1962) – Minor Role (uncredited)
 The Small World of Sammy Lee (1963) – Dealer
 Call Me Bwana (1963) – Second Henchman
 Game for Three Losers  (Edgar Wallace Mysteries)(1965) – Nick
 Dr. Terror's House of Horrors (1965) – Detective (segment "Vampire")
 Lost Command (1966) – Mugnier
 The Good, the Bad and the Ugly (1966) – One-Armed Bounty Hunter
 Huyendo del halcón (1966) (released in 1973)
 The Hellbenders  (1967) – The Beggar
 The Treasure of Makuba (1967) – Pat
 Battle Beneath the Earth (1967) – Sgt. Marvin Mulberry
 Reflections in a Golden Eye (1967) – Private (uncredited)
 Day of Anger  (1967) – Wild Jack (uncredited in Italian version)
 Shoot Twice (1968)
 Once Upon a Time in the West (1968) – Knuckles – Member of Frank's Gang (uncredited) (final film role)

References

External links
 
 Al Mulock(Aveleyman)

1926 births
1968 deaths
1968 suicides
20th-century Canadian male actors
Canadian expatriates in Spain
Canadian male film actors
Expatriate actors in Spain
Male Spaghetti Western actors
Male actors from Toronto
Suicides by jumping in Spain